is a railway station in the city of Sukagawa, Fukushima, Japan operated by the East Japan Railway Company (JR East).

Lines

Station layout
The station has two opposed side platforms connected to the station building by a footbridge; however, one of the platforms in no longer in use, and the overhead passageway has been discontinued, rendering the station effectively a single side platform station serving a single bi-directional track. The station is unattended.

History
Kawahigashi Station opened on October 10, 1931. The station was absorbed into the JR East network upon the privatization of the Japanese National Railways (JNR) on April 1, 1987.

Surrounding area
 Kawahigashi Post Office
Abukuma River
Wada no Daibutsu

See also
 List of Railway Stations in Japan

References

External links

  

Stations of East Japan Railway Company
Railway stations in Fukushima Prefecture
Suigun Line
Railway stations in Japan opened in 1931
Sukagawa, Fukushima